Mir Ahmad may refer to:

Mir Ahmad I
Mir Ahmad II
Mir Ahmad, Khuzestan
Mir Ahmad, Lorestan